Ala Kachuu – Take and Run is a 2020 Swiss short film directed by Maria Brendle and produced by Nadine Lüchinger and Flavio Gerber, Filmgerberei. The film is about a Kyrgyz girl who falls victim to bride kidnapping (Kyrgyz: Ala Kachuu).

Ala Kachuu has been shown at the Oscar qualifying festivals 11th BronzeLens Film Festival, 45th Cleveland International Film Festival, 16th HollyShorts Film Festival and the 38th Flickers’ Rhode Island Film Festival. It has been nominated for Best Live Action Short Film at the 94th Academy Awards.

Plot 
Sezim (Alina Turdumamatova) wants to fulfill her dream of studying in the Kyrgyz capital when she gets kidnapped by a group of young men and taken to the hinterland. There, she is forced to marry a stranger. If she refuses the marriage, she is threatened with social stigmatization and exclusion. Torn between her desire for freedom and the constraints of Kyrgyz culture, Sezim desperately seeks for a way out.

Background 
The 38-minute short film deals with bride kidnapping (Kyrgyz: Ala Kachuu), a form of forced marriage. The custom is heavily criticized, but is still widespread in Kyrgyz society. The film's title is based on the Kyrgyz term for bride kidnapping, which translates as "grab and run."

Maria Brendle motivation behind the short film was that the custom of bride kidnapping, despite its high incidence, is largely unknown outside the affected countries. She wants to use the short film to draw attention to the fate of the victims in order to bring more attention to them.

Cast 

 Alina Turdumamatova: Sezim
 Nurbek Esengazy Uulu: Dayrbek
 Madina Talipbekova: Aksana
 Aybike Erkinbekova: Aygul
 Jandat Djamanbaeva: Grandmother
 Taalaykan Abazova: Sezim's Mother
 Sheker Joomartova: Dayrbek's Mother

Premiere 
The short film had its world premiere at the 38th Rhode Island International Film Festival in August 2020 and was awarded the Marlyn Mason Award - First Prize for new voices and new perspectives by women in film at its premiere.

Awards

References

External links 

 Ala Kachuu official website
 

Swiss short films
2020 short films
Films set in Kyrgyzstan